The 2017 South Carolina State Bulldogs football team represented South Carolina State University in the 2017 NCAA Division I FCS football season. They were led by 16th-year head coach Oliver Pough and played their home games at Oliver C. Dawson Stadium. They were a member of the Mid-Eastern Athletic Conference (MEAC). They finished the season 3–7, 2–6 in MEAC play to finish in a three-way tie for eighth place.

Schedule

The game between Charleston Southern and South Carolina, recently had been rescheduled in advance of the arrival of Hurricane Irma, but on September 7, both schools agreed to postpone the game later in the season, but was ultimately cancelled.
Source: Schedule

Game summaries

at Southern (MEAC/SWAC Challenge)

Johnson C. Smith

at North Carolina Central

North Carolina A&T

Morgan State

at Bethune–Cookman

at Delaware State

Howard

Hampton

at Savannah State

References

South Carolina State
South Carolina State Bulldogs football seasons
South Carolina State Bulldogs football